Open Your Eyes (OYE) was an American magazine aimed at Latino men. The magazine was based in Los Angeles. OYE was published from July 1999 until 2011. It offered stories on entertainment, women, sports, cars, relationships, humor, and Latino culture.

References

External links

Men's magazines published in the United States
Hispanic and Latino American mass media
Magazines established in 1999
Magazines published in Los Angeles
Magazines disestablished in 2011
Defunct magazines published in the United States
1999 establishments in California